NGC 1924 is a barred spiral galaxy in the constellation of Orion. It was discovered on October 5, 1785, by William Herschel.

References

External links
 

1924
17319
J05280197-0518383
Orion (constellation)
Barred spiral galaxies
17851005